Roshan Anurudda (born 15 January 1995) is a Sri Lankan cricketer. He made his first-class debut for Colombo Cricket Club in the 2014–15 Premier Trophy on 5 March 2015. He along with Lasith Abeyratne, he holds the record for the 7th-wicket partnership in any forms of T20 cricket, with 107 runs not out.

References

External links
 

1995 births
Living people
Sri Lankan cricketers
Colombo Cricket Club cricketers
Saracens Sports Club cricketers
People from Ragama